Toney Bruce Catchings (born August 11, 1965) is a former American football linebacker who played for the Cincinnati Bengals of the National Football League (NFL). He played college football at University of Cincinnati.

References 

Living people
American football linebackers
Cincinnati Bearcats football players
1965 births
Players of American football from Mississippi
Cincinnati Bengals players